Niles Township may refer to the following places in the United States:

 Niles Township, Cook County, Illinois
 Niles Township, Delaware County, Indiana
 Niles Township, Floyd  County, Iowa
 Niles Charter Township, Michigan

See also
 Nile Township, Scioto County, Ohio

Township name disambiguation pages